Archibald Philip Mitchell (15 December 1885 – 16 April 1949) was an English professional footballer and manager. He is best remembered for his long spell as a centre half with Queens Park Rangers, for whom he made over 300 appearances and later managed. Mitchell began his professional career with Aston Villa.

Club career

Early years and Aston Villa 
A centre half, Mitchell began his playing career with amateur side Oldbury St John's, before transferring to First Division club Aston Villa in 1905. He failed to make a first team appearance for the club, appearing instead for the reserve team. With the reserves, he helped the team win the Birmingham & District League title in the 1905–06 and 1906–07 seasons. Mitchell departed Villa in 1907.

Queens Park Rangers 
On 2 May 1907, Mitchell joined Southern League First Division club Queens Park Rangers. He had a good start to his career with the Hoops, winning the 1907–08 First Division title in his debut season. A further First Division title was won in 1911–12, with the Charity Shield being lost 2–1 to Football League First Division champions Blackburn Rovers. He remained with Queens Park Rangers through to 1921 and finally made his Football League debut at the age of 34 in the 1920–21 season, after the club were elected to the Football League Third Division. He made 35 appearances and scored three goals during the 1920–21 season. By the time he left the Hoops at the end of the campaign, Mitchell had made over 330 appearances for the club, excluding unofficial wartime competitions.

Brentford 
Mitchell joined Third Division South West London rivals Brentford as player in August 1921, after having previously made an appearance for the club as a guest during the First World War. He made 16 appearances and scored two goals for the Bees, with the final appearance of his career coming as a goalkeeper in the final away league game of the 1921–22 season away to Swansea Town.

Management career

Brentford 
When Mitchell joined Third Division South club Brentford in August 1921, he became the club's player-manager. He presided over three forgettable campaigns, with his best finish being 9th in the 1921–22 season. After a run of seven straight defeats, Mitchell left the club in December 1924.

Queens Park Rangers 
After coaching in the Balkans and a two-year stint as manager of Southern League club Dartford, Mitchell returned to former club Queens Park Rangers as manager in November 1931, replacing John Bowman, who had to step down due to ill-health. He led the club to a mid-table finish in what remained of the 1931–32 Third Division South season and resigned at the end of the 1932–33 season.

International and representative career 
Mitchell made one appearance for England Juniors and made seven appearances for the Southern League representative team while with Queens Park Rangers. He made an appearance for the Football League XI in a 4–1 win over the Army on 10 November 1921.

Personal life 
After leaving Brentford and before departing for the Balkans, Mitchell worked in Acton as a schoolteacher.

Career statistics

Player

Manager

Honours 
Aston Villa Reserves
 Birmingham & District League (2): 1905–06, 1906–07
Queens Park Rangers
 Southern League First Division (2): 1907–08, 1911–12

References

External links

1885 births
1949 deaths
English footballers
Aston Villa F.C. players
Queens Park Rangers F.C. players
Brentford F.C. players
English Football League players
English football managers
Brentford F.C. managers
Queens Park Rangers F.C. managers
Sportspeople from Smethwick
English Football League managers
Dartford F.C. managers
Southern Football League players
English expatriates in Canada
England youth international footballers
Association football central defenders
English Football League representative players
Southern Football League representative players
Brentford F.C. wartime guest players
Association football coaches